Mstitel is a 1959 Czechoslovak drama film directed by Karel Steklý.

Cast
 Radoslav Brzobohatý as Len
 Ivanka Devátá as Marynka
 Jan Pivec as Konopik
 Libuše Řídelová as Kabourková
 Josef Beyvl as Cverenc
 Gustav Nezval as Zedník krystof

References

External links
 

1959 films
1959 drama films
Czech drama films
Czechoslovak drama films
1950s Czech-language films
Films directed by Karel Steklý
1950s Czech films